Trixie is a shortened form of the given names Beatrix or Beatrice or Patricia or adopted as a nickname or used as a given name.

Trixie may refer to:

People 

 Trixie Friganza (1870–1955), American vaudeville performer and stage and silent film actress
 Trixie Gardner, Baroness Gardner of Parkes (born 1927), Australian-born British politician, dentist and peeress
 Trixie Maristela (born 1985), Filipino transgender actress
 Trixie Mattel (born 1989), American drag queen and winner of RuPaul's Drag Race All Stars season 3
 Trixie Minx (born 1981), American burlesque dancer
 Trixi Schuba (born 1951), Austrian figure skater
 Trixie Smith (1895–1943), African American blues singer, vaudeville entertainer and actress
 Trixie Tagg, Australian soccer player and coach
 Trixie Whitley (born 1987), Belgian American multi-instrumentalist
 Beatrix 'Trixi' Pospíšilová Čelková (1925-1997), Slovak World War II era spy and antifascist resistance member

Fictional characters 

 Thelma Norton, a character in the series The Honeymooners, is nicknamed Trixie
 Trixie, a character in the series Speed Racer
 Trixie, a character in the series Deadwood
 Trixie, a character in the series LazyTown
 Trixie, a triceratops toy in the film Toy Story 3
 Trixie Belden, the title character of a series of mysteries
 Trixie Lorraine, a character in the movie Gold Diggers of 1933 portrayed by Aline MacMahon
 Trixie Sting, a character in Slugterra
 Trixie Tang, a character in the series The Fairly OddParents
 Trixie Lulamoon, a character in the series My Little Pony: Friendship Is Magic
 Trixie Carter, a character in the series American Dragon: Jake Long
 Trixie Tucker, a character in the Australian television soap opera Neighbours
 Trixie Franklin, a character in Call the Midwife played by Helen George
 Trixie, a female cat in Top Cat: The Movie
 Trixie, the infant daughter in the comic strip Hi and Lois
 Beatrice "Trixie" Espinoza, a character in the American television series, Lucifer.

Film 

 Trixie (film),  a 2000 American mystery-crime film
 Trixie Film, producer of the Burn to Shine DVD series
 A fictional virus in the 1973 film The Crazies and its 2010 remake, alternatively titled Code Name: Trixie
 A working title of Star Wars: The Rise of Skywalker
Trixie Mattel: Moving Parts, a documentary showcasing what happens backstage during Trixie Mattel's Moving Parts tour

Other uses

 Cyclone Trixie (1975)
 Trixie (bet), a type of wager
 Trixie (slang), a derogatory slang term